Liliales is an order of monocotyledonous flowering plants in the Angiosperm Phylogeny Group and Angiosperm Phylogeny Web system, within the lilioid monocots. This order of necessity includes the family Liliaceae. The APG III system (2009) places this order in the monocot clade. In APG III, the family Luzuriagaceae is combined with the family Alstroemeriaceae and the family Petermanniaceae is recognized. Both the order Lililiales and the family Liliaceae have had a widely disputed history, with the circumscription varying greatly from one taxonomist to another. Previous members of this order, which at one stage included most monocots with  conspicuous tepals and lacking starch in the endosperm are now distributed over three orders, Liliales, Dioscoreales and Asparagales, using predominantly molecular phylogenetics. The newly delimited Liliales is monophyletic, with ten families. Well known plants from the order include Lilium (lily), tulip, the North American wildflower Trillium, and greenbrier.

Thus circumscribed, this order consists mostly of herbaceous plants, but lianas and shrubs also occur. They are mostly perennial plants, with food storage organs such as corms or rhizomes. The family Corsiaceae is notable for being heterotrophic.

The order has worldwide distribution. The larger families (with more than 100 species) are roughly confined to the Northern Hemisphere, or are distributed worldwide, centering on the north. On the other hand, the smaller families (with up to 10 species) are confined to the Southern Hemisphere, or sometimes just to Australia or South America. The total number of species in the order is now about 1768.

As with any herbaceous group, the fossil record of the Liliales is rather scarce. There are several species from the Eocene, such as Petermanniopsis anglesaensis or Smilax, but their identification is not definite. Another known fossil is Ripogonum scandens from the Miocene. Due to the scarcity of data, it seems impossible to determine precisely the age and the initial distribution of the order. It is assumed that the Liliales originate from the Lower Cretaceous, over 100 million years ago. Fossil aquatic plants from the Cretaceous of northeastern Brazil and a new terrestrial species placed in the new genus Cratosmilax suggest that the first species have appeared around 120 million years ago when the continents formed Pangea, before dispersing as Asia, Africa and America. The initial diversification to the current families took place between 82 and 48 million years ago. The order consists of 10 families, 67 genera and about 1,768 species.

Description 

The Liliales are a diverse order of predominantly perennial erect or twining herbaceous and climbing plants. Climbers, such as the herbaceous Gloriosa (Colchicaceae) and Bomarea (Alstroemeriaceae), are common in the Americas in temperate and tropical zones, while  most species of the subtropical and tropical genus Smilax (Smilacaceae) are herbaceous or woody climbers and comprise much of the vegetation within the Liliales range. They also include woody shrubs, which have fleshy stems and underground storage or perennating organs, mainly bulbous geophytes, sometimes rhizomatous or cormous. Leaves are elliptical and straplike with parallel venation or ovate with palmate veins and reticulate minor venation (Smilacaceae). In Alstroemeria and Bomarea (Alstroemeriaceae) the leaves are resupinate (twisted).  

The flowers are highly variable, ranging in size from the small green actinomorphic (radially symmetric) blooms of Smilax to the large showy ones found in Lilium, Tulipa and Calochortus (Liliaceae) and Lapageria (Philesiaceae). Sepals and petals are undifferentiated from each other, and known as tepals, forming a perianth. They are usually large and pointed and may be variegated in Fritillaria (Liliaceae). Nectaries may be perigonal (at base of tepals) but not septal (on ovaries). Perigonal nectaries may be a simple secretory epidermal region at the tepal bases (Lapageria) or small, depressed regions fringed with hairs, often with glandular surface protuberances, at the bases of the inner tepals (Calochortus), while in Tricyrtis the tepals become bulbous or spur-like at the base, forming a nectar-containing sac. Ovaries may be inferior or superior, the style often long and stigma capitate (pin headed). In a number of taxa there are three separate styles, particularly  some Melanthiaceae s.l. (e.g. Helonias, Trillium, Veratrum) and Chionographis. The outer integument epidermis of the seed coat is cellular, and the phytomelanin pigment is lacking. The inner integument is also cellular and these features are plesiomorphic.

The Liliales are characterised by (synapomorphies) the presence of nectaries at the base of the tepals (perigonal nectaries) or stamen filaments (Colchicum, Androcymbium) most taxa but the absence of septal nectaries, together with extrorse (outward opening) anthers. This distinguishes them from the septal nectaries and introrse anthers that are the features of most other monocots. Exceptions are some Melanthiaceae in which nectaries are absent or septal and anthers that are introrse (dehiscence directed inwards) in Campynemataceae, Colchicaceae, and some Alstroemeriaceae, Melanthiaceae, Philesiaceae, Ripogonaceae and Smilacaceae. Tepals are largely three-traced in net-veined taxa of Liliales (e.g. Clintonia, Disporum), distinguishing them from the single-traced Asparagales, and is associated with the presence of tepal nectaries, presumably to supply them. The presence of separate styles is also a distinguishing feature from Asparagales, where it is rare. Phytomelan is completely absent in Liliales seed coats, unlike Asparagales, which nearly all contain it.

Phytochemistry 

The stems contain fructans, the plants also contain Chelidonic acid, saponins, while some species contain Velamen. The epicuticular wax is of the Convallaria type, consisting of parallel orientated platelets.

Genome 

The order includes taxa with some of the largest genomes among Angiosperms, particularly Melanthiaceae, Alstroemeriaceae and Liliaceae.

Taxonomy 

With 11 families, about 67 genera and about 1,558 species, Liliales is a relatively small angiosperm order, but a large group within the monocotyledons.

History

Origins 

The botanical authority for Liliales is given to Perleb (1826), who grouped eleven families (Asparageae, Pontederiaceae, Asphodeleae, Coronariae, Colchicaceae, Dioscoreaceae, Hypoxideae, Amaryllideae, Haemodoraceae, Burmanniaceae, Irideae) into an order he called Liliaceae. In Perleb's system, he divided the vascular plants into seven classes, of which the Phanerogamicae or seed plants he called his class IV, or Ternariae. The latter, he divided into five orders (ordo), including the Liliaceae.

A number of later taxonomists, such as Endlicher (1836) substitituted the term Coronarieae for this higher order, including six subordinate taxa. Endlicher divided the Cormophyta into five sections, of which Amphibrya contained eleven classes, including Coronarieae. The term Liliales was introduced by Lindley (1853), referring to these higher orders as Alliances. Lindley included four families in this alliance. Lindley called the monocots class Endogenae, with eleven alliances including Liliales. Although Bentham (1877) restored Coronariae as one of seven Series making up the monocotyledons, it was replaced by Liliiflorae and then Liliales in subsequent publications (see Table for history).

Phyletic systems 

Subsequent authors, now adopting a phylogenetic (phyletic) or evolutionary approach over the natural method, did not follow Bentham's nomenclature. Eichler (1886) used Liliiflorae for the higher order including Liliaceae, placing it as the first order (Reihe) in his class monocotyledons, as did Engler (1903), Lotsy (1911), and Wettstein in 1924, in class Monocotyledones, subdivision Angiospermae.

Hutchinson (1973) restored Liliales for the higher rank, an approach that has been adopted by most major classification systems onwards, reserving Liliiflorae for higher ranks. These include Cronquist (1981), Dahlgren (1985), Takhtajan (1997) as well as Thorne and Reveal (2007).

Hutchinson (1973) derived a more elaborate hierarchy, placing order Liliales as one of 14 in division Corolliferae, one of three divisions of subphylum monocotyledons. Cronquist (1981) placed the order Liliales as one of two in subclass Liliidae, one of five in the class Liliopsida (monocotyledons) of division Magnoliophyta (angiosperms). Dahlgren (1985) made Liliales one of six orders in Superorder Liliiflorae, one of ten divisions of the monocots. Takhtajan (1997) had a more complex system of higher taxonomic ranks, placing Liliales as one of 15 orders within superorder Lilianae, one of four within subclass Liliidae. Liliidae in turn was one of four subclasses in class Liliopsida (monocots). In contrast Thorne and Reveal (2007) abandoned the use of monocotyledons as a distinct taxon, replacing it with 3 separate subclasses of Magnoliopsida (angiosperms), of which Liliidae consists of 3 superorders, placing Liliales in superorder Lilianae.

In all these systems, Liliales (or Liliiflorae) were visualised as either a direct division of the monocots (or equivalent) or were placed in an intermediate division of the monocots, such as superorder Lilianae.

Molecular phylogenetic systems 

The development of molecular phylogenetic methods for determining taxonomic circumscription and phylogeny led to considerable revision of angiosperm classification, and establishment of Liliales as a monophyletic group. It was clear by 1996, that the most useful system to date, that of Dahlgren, required urgent revision. The new classification was formalised with the creation of the Angiosperm Phylogeny Group (APG) system (1998–2016), based on monophyletic clades, which continued the use of Liliales as the name for the taxon.

The Angiosperm Phylogeny Group APG system (1998) established a structure of monocot classification with ten orders. Notable was the separation of asparagids, as suggested by Dahlgren, into Asparagales, with other taxa placed in Dioscoreales, resulting in a much reduced order.

Phylogeny 

The position of Liliales within the monocots (Lilianae) is shown in the following cladogram. The monocot orders form three grades, the alismatid monocots, lilioid monocots and the commelinid monocots by order of branching, from early to late. These have alternatively been referred to as Alismatanae, Lilianae and Commelinanae. The alismatid monocots form the basal group, while the remaining grades (lilioid and commelinid monocots) have been referred to as the "core monocots". The relationship between the orders (with the exception of the two sister orders) is pectinate, that is diverging in succession from the line that leads to the commelinids. The lilioid monocot orders constitute a paraphyletic assemblage, that is groups with a common ancestor that do not include all direct descendants (in this case commelinids which are a sister group to Asparagales); to form a clade, all the groups joined by thick lines would need to be included. In the cladogram the numbers indicate crown group (most recent common ancestor of the sampled species of the clade of interest) divergence times in mya (million years ago).

{|
|Cladogram 1: The phylogenetic composition of the monocots

Biogeography and evolution 

The crown group of Liliales has been dated to ca. 117 Myr (million years ago) in the Early Cretaceous period of the Mesozoic era.

Subdivision 

The circumscription of Liliales has varied greatly since Perleb's original construction with 11 families in 1826. Many of these families are now considered to be in Asparagales, with the remainder in commelinids and Dioscoreales, as shown in this table.

The availability of molecular phylogenetic methods suggested four main lineages within Liliales, and seven families; 
 Liliaceae group: Liliaceae (including some former Uvulariaceae and Calochortaceae), and Smilacaceae (including Ripogonaceae and Philesiaceae) 
 Campynemataceae
 Colchicaceae group: Colchicaceae (including Petermannia and Uvularia), Alstroemeriaceae and Luzuriaga
 Melanthiaceae (including Trilliaceae)

The first Angiosperm Phylogeny Group classification (APG I) in 1998 had the following circumscription, with 9 families, having separated Philesiaceae and Ripogonaceae from Smilacaceae:
 order Liliales
 family Alstroemeriaceae
 family Campynemataceae
 family Colchicaceae
 family Liliaceae
 family Luzuriagaceae
 family Melanthiaceae
 family Philesiaceae
 family Ripogonaceae 
 family Smilacaceae

The APG II system (2003) added Corsiaceae to the Liliales, while APG III (2009) added Petermanniaceae and merged Luzuriagaceae into Alstroemeriaceae. The subsequent revision of APG IV (2016) left this unchanged, with 10 families.

The exact phylogenetic relationship between the families of Liliales has been subject to revision. This cladogram shows that of the Angiosperm Phylogeny Website (2020):

The bulk of the Liliales species are found in the very diverse family Liliaceae (16 genera, 610 species). Of the remaining nine families, three are referred to as the vine families (Ripogonaceae, Philesiaceae and Smilacaceae) and form a cluster.

Families

Distribution and habitat 

Widely distributed but most commonly found in subtropical and temperate regions, especially herbaceous taxa in temperate regions of the Northern Hemisphere, and subtropical regions of the Southern hemisphere, including vines. Since many species are cultivated they have been introduced in many regions and consequently worldwide, and a number have subsequently escaped and naturalised.

Uses 
Liliales form important sources of food and pharmaceuticals as well as playing a significant role in horticulture and floriculture as ornamental plants. Pharmaceutical products include colchicine from Colchicum and Gloriosa (Colchicaceae) and veratrine and related compounds from Veratrum (Melanthiaceae) and Zigadenus (Melanthiaceae).

Notes

References

Bibliography

Books and symposia 

 
 
 
 
 
 
 
  Excerpts

Taxonomic systems
 
   Additional excerpts
 
 , (additional excerpts)

Historical sources 

 
 
 
 
 , see also Syllabus der Pflanzenfamilien

Chapters 

 
 , In 
 , In 
 
 , in

Articles 

 
 
 
 
 
 
 
 
 
 
 
 

APG

Websites 

 
 
  (see also Angiosperm Phylogeny Website)
  (see also Angiosperm Phylogeny Website)

Further reading

Books and symposia

Historical sources

Articles

Websites 

 

 
Angiosperm orders
Extant Aptian first appearances